Trofeo Zsšdi-Unione dei Circoli Sportivi Sloveni in Italia is a road bicycle race held annually in Friuli Venezia Giulia, Italy. The trophy is contested around Trieste, near the frontier between Italy and Slovenia. Since 2005, it is classified as a 1.2 event on the UCI Europe Tour.

Winners

External links
 Official Website 

UCI Europe Tour races
Cycle races in Italy
Cycle races in Slovenia
Recurring sporting events established in 1977
1977 establishments in Italy
Spring (season) events in Slovenia